Vellala Street, also known as Vellalar Street, is a residential street in Purasawalkam in Chennai in the state of Tamil Nadu, India. Vellalar is supposedly a caste name crediting to the early residents who belonged to this caste. Later these distinctions vanished and led way to more diverse residents. One of the leading figures of early literature in English R. K. Narayan and his youngest brother R. K. Laxman, an Indian cartoonist, illustrator, and humorist were living at Number 1, Vellala Street.

Landmarks
Over the years, Vellala Street has changed from being a quiet bylane of Purasawalkam to a noisy one-way lane. But one landmark still remains - the Srinivasa Perumal temple

Places of Worship
Two noticeable temple are located in this street. Karpaga Vinayagar Temple and Srinivasa Perumal Temple

Educational institutions
Meena Typing Institute

Schools
Corporation School

Shopping
Regular department stores, Muthu Pharmacy

References

Streets in India